The Supreme Advisory Council (DPA), is a defunct advisory council for the President of Indonesia. Its function was to give advice on state and foreign affairs.

Background 
There was no credible source about the background of the council's formation when it was embodied in the Constitution of Indonesia. In the founding fathers of Indonesia itself, there was an opinion that the council was based on the village traditions in Indonesia, on which the villagers decided matters and resolve conflict with a "council of elders". This "council of elders" was in par with the Supreme Advisory Council, which was composed of retired politicians.

History

Formation 
The council was established one month and one week after the proclamation of independence of the Republic of Indonesia. When it was first established on September 25, 1945. The name for the council was Advisory Council, which was suggested by Mohammad Yamin. The name was approved by Sukarno. However, several months later, the name was changed to the Supreme Advisory Body. It was later changed again into the Supreme Advisory Council.

The Supreme Advisory Council was formed with the announcement of the formation of the council in the Official Gazette No. 4 of 1945. Due to the emergency situation of the country, the council was not formed with a binding law. The priority at that time was to form a temporary advisory council as soon as possible under the Constitution of Indonesia. The council was formed on 25 September 1945 with Margono Djojohadikusumo as its chairman and Radjiman Wediodiningrat, Syech Dahlan Djambek, Agus Salim, K.R.M.T.H. Wurjaningrat, H. Adnan, Mochammad Enoch, Dr. Latumeten, Pangeran Mochammad Noor, Sukiman Wirjosandjojo, Nyonya Soewarni Pringgodigdo, as its members.

Several months after its formation, on 6 November 1945, chairman of the council Margono resigned from his position. He was replaced by Wiranatakusumah on 29 November 1945. Later, in 1948, there was an addition of eleven members to the council, namely Ario Soerjo, Sutardjo Kartohadikusumo, Abdul Wahab Hasbullah, Ki Hadjar Dewantara, Frits Laoh, Daud Beureu'eh, Anwarudin, Oerip Soemohardjo, Ernest Douwes Dekker, Moch. Sjafei, and Liem Ing Hwie.

On 24 April 1948, Wiranatakusumah was installed as the Wali Negara of Pasundan. Ario Soerjo replaced him as the chairman, but several days later he was assassinated on 10 November 1948. To replace him, the vice chairman of the council Sutardjo Kartohadikusumo was installed on 15 November 1948. Ki Hadjar Dewantara was later appointed as vice chairman of the council.

During the liberal democracy period in Indonesia, the organization was dissolved in 1950, and was restructured into the National Council on 1957. The National Council was dissolved in 1959, and formed the Provisional Supreme Advisory Council, with Sukarno, the president of Indonesia, as its chairman.

After the fall of Sukarno, the council was restored as a structural organization in 1967. It was dissolved on 31 July 2003 after the amendments to the Constitution of Indonesia. The functions of the council, which is previously regulated in the section IV of the constitution, was removed.

Professor Harun Al-Rasjid from the Law Faculty of the University of Indonesia, a critic of the operations of the Council, dubbed the DPA as the Dewan Paling Anteng (Most Serene Council). Rasjid stated that the result of the Supreme Advisory Council was unknown by the public and that its existence should be reviewed.

List of chairmen

Bibliography

References 

Advisory councils for heads of state
Politics of Indonesia